Some Rainy Morning is a blues album by Robert Cray, released in 1995 through Mercury Records.

Track listing 
"Moan" (Cray) - 6:01
"I'll Go On" (Cray) - 4:11
"Steppin' Out" (Howard Grimes, Andrew Hall, Earl Randle) - 4:48
"Never Mattered Much" (Cray) - 4:46
"Tell the Landlord" (Cray, Kevin Hayes, Karl Sevareid) - 4:53
"Little Boy Big" (Cray) - 5:12
"Enough for Me" (Cray, Kevin Hayes) - 6:20
"Jealous Love" (King Curtis, Bobby Womack) - 4:13
"Will You Think of Me" (Cray, Jimmy Pugh) - 5:29
"Holdin' On" (Jimmy Pugh) - 6:31
'Love Well Spent" (Jimmy Pugh, Kenney Dale Johnson) (European bonus) - 4:45

Personnel
Robert Cray - vocals, guitar
Karl Sevareid - bass
Jimmy Pugh - organ, piano
Kevin Hayes - drums

References

1995 albums
Robert Cray albums
Mercury Records albums